The 2020–21 Egypt Cup was the 89th edition of the oldest recognised football tournament in Africa. It is sponsored by Tiger Chips, and known as the Tiger Egypt Cup for sponsorship purposes. It started with the First Preliminary Round on 12 January 2021, and concluded with the final on  21 July 2022.

Egyptian Premier League side Al Ahly are the defending champions, having defeated Tala'ea El Gaish in the final.

The competition was originally scheduled to start in November 2020, but was postponed to early 2021 due to the COVID-19 pandemic in Egypt.

Teams

Round and draw dates
The schedule is as follows.

Format

Participation
The Egypt Cup begin with a round of 32 teams. The 18 teams of the Egyptian Premier League, along with the 14 winning teams qualified from the Fourth Preliminary Round of the 2020–21 Egypt Cup qualifying rounds.

Draw
The draw for the main competition was held at the Egyptian Football Association headquarters in Gezira, Cairo on 6 February 2021.

The 32 participating teams were separated into 3 pots. Pot 1 included the 15th placed team from the previous season of the Egyptian Premier League alongside the 3 promoted teams from the 2019–20 Egyptian Second Division, Pot 2 included the top 14 teams from the previous season of the Egyptian Premier League, and Pot 3 included all 14 teams who qualified to the competition through the qualifying rounds.

Teams from Pot 1 were drawn against each other, while teams from Pot 2 were drawn against teams from Pot 3.

Usually, the Egypt Cup defending champions and the Egyptian Premier League winners are placed in different paths, so both teams can face each other only in the final. However, since Al Ahly won both the cup and the league last season, the club was placed in the "league path" while the league runners-up, Zamalek, were placed in the "cup path".

Match rules
Teams meet in one game per round. Matches take place for 90 minutes, with two-halves of 45 minutes. If still tied after regulation, 30 minutes of extra time will be played, consisting of two periods of 15 minutes. If the score is still level after this, the match will be decided by a penalty shoot-out. A coin toss will decide who takes the first penalty. A total of seven players are allowed to be listed on the substitute bench, with up to three substitutions being allowed during regulation.

All matches will be played on venues selected by the Egyptian Football Association.

Champion qualification
The winners of the Egypt Cup will earn automatic qualification for the 2021–22 CAF Confederation Cup. If they have already qualified for the CAF Confederation Cup or CAF Champions League through their position in the Egyptian Premier League, then the spot will go to the cup runners-up. If the cup runners-up also qualified for an African competition through their league position, then the spot will be given to the fourth placed team in the league.

Following the postponement of numerous match in the competition throughout the season, the competition was not finished by the CAF deadline for associations to submit participating teams in next season's African competitions. As a result, the Egyptian Football Association announced that Pyramids, who were at fourth place after 29 rounds (the last completed round in the 2020–21 Egyptian Premier League before the CAF deadline), would take the cup winners slot and would represent Egypt in the 2021–22 CAF Confederation Cup instead of the cup winners.

Qualifying rounds

All of the competing teams that are not members of the Egyptian Premier League had to compete in the qualifying rounds to secure one of 14 available places in the Round of 32. The qualifying phase began with the First Preliminary Round on 12 January 2021, and concluded with the Fourth Preliminary Round on 6 February 2021.

Round of 32
All matches were played between 11 and 24 February 2021, except matches involving teams participating in African competitions (Al Ahly, Pyramids and Zamalek) were postponed and played on 13 March and 14 April 2021. This round includes one team from the Egyptian Fourth Division, La Viena, the lowest ranking side left in the competition. La Viena also became the first club from the lowest league in the Egyptian football league system to qualify for the main round of the Egypt Cup in the competition's history; having participated in all preliminary qualifying rounds.

All times are CAT (UTC+2).

Round of 16
Matches were played between 8 March and 25 September 2021. All matches were initially scheduled to be played between 15 and 23 April 2021. One match involving two teams from the Egyptian Second Division was moved to 8 March 2021 to avoid scheduling conflicts, while unconfirmed matches at that time (involving winning teams from round of 32 fixtures featuring Al Ahly, Pyramids and Zamalek) were postponed to a later date. This round included two teams from the Egyptian Second Division, Coca-Cola and Petrojet, the lowest ranking sides left in the competition.

All times are CAT (UTC+2).

Quarter-finals
First match in this round was played on 29 April 2021. This round includes one team from the Egyptian Second Division, Petrojet, the lowest ranking side left in the competition.

All times are CAT (UTC+2).

Semi-finals
The matches are expected to be played in 2022. This round includes one team from the Egyptian Second Division, Petrojet, the lowest ranking side left in the competition.

All times are CAT (UTC+2).

Final

All times are CAT (UTC+2).

Bracket
The following is the bracket which the Egypt Cup resembles. Numbers in parentheses next to the match score represent the results of a penalty shoot-out.

Top goalscorers

References

Notes

 
Egypt Cup
Egypt
Association football events postponed due to the COVID-19 pandemic